Clipped Wings may refer to:

 Wing clipping, in aviculture, a feather-trimming procedure
 Clipped Wings (1937 film), an American crime film by Stuart Paton
 Clipped Wings (1953 film), an American comedy starring the Bowery Boys
 "Clipped Wings" (Touched by an Angel), an episode of Touched by an Angel
 "Clipped Wings", a song by R. Kelly from Write Me Back